Jacqueline MacInnes Wood (born 17 April 1987) is a Canadian actress, musician and television personality. For playing fashion executive and heiress Steffy Forrester Finnegan in the CBS soap opera The Bold and the Beautiful (2008–present), she won two Daytime Emmy Awards for Outstanding Lead Actress in a Drama Series in 2019 and 2021. She has additionally starred as Olivia Castle in the horror film Final Destination 5 (2011), and hosted the E! series Party On (2013–2014).

Early life
Jacqueline MacInnes Wood was born in Windsor, Ontario, the daughter of (Sandie) Alexandra MacInnes and James C. Wood. She is of  indigenous (Cree), Scottish, French and Brazilian ancestry.  Her half sister is Dani Probert, who was the wife of the late NHL player, Bob Probert. Her great uncle is Scottish highland singer Alasdair Gillies. Wood took acting classes at Ryerson University, Centre for the Arts and the Armstrong Acting Studio.

Career

Acting career

The Bold and the Beautiful 
Wood made a name for herself playing the part of the "hair girl" on a commercial for First Choice Haircutters. At the age of 18, she moved to Toronto to pursue a career in acting. In May 2008, she began playing the contract role of Steffy Forrester on the American CBS Daytime soap opera The Bold and the Beautiful. Since Wood stepped into the role, Steffy has been noted as being a "bitch-nasty" vixen who is strong willed. Of playing her, Wood said in 2011, "I love playing her and developing her character. She is so different from me. It's rather cathartic, and it allows my alter ego to come out on The Bold and The Beautiful set five days a week."

In 2012, Wood received her very first nomination for Outstanding Younger Actress in a Drama Series for her portrayal of Steffy at the 39th Daytime Emmy Awards. Of learning about her Emmy nomination, she said, "I was just about to shoot a scene in the Adriatic sea in Italy. The water was only 54 degrees! [Executive Producer/Head Writer] Brad Bell came up to me and said, "How does it feel to be Emmy nominated?" For that year, Wood submitted the scenes in which Steffy is informed of the end of her affair with Bill.

In 2013, Wood garnered her second consecutive nomination in that category at the 40th Daytime Emmy Awards, in which she submitted the scenes where Steffy surprises Liam (Scott Clifton) by presenting him with signed annulment papers. In May 2013, news broke that Wood had opted not to renew her contract with the show in order to take another break. A representative for the show stated: "[Wood] is taking short a break, as she has done in the past, from B&B. She remains as the character of 'Steffy Forrester' and is continuing to tape, currently with episodes airing through July 2013 and then beyond". It was later announced that Wood has decided to remain with the series on a recurring basis.

In April 2015, it was announced that Wood would reprise her role on B&B on a contract basis, which she has remained on ever since. For the 2018 Daytime Emmy Awards, Wood received a nomination for Outstanding Supporting Actress in a Drama Series in the role. In the following year, Wood ascended and earned a nomination for Outstanding Lead Actress in a Drama Series, becoming the fifth actress overall, to have been nominated in all three drama performer categories. At the 2019 Daytime Emmy Awards ceremony, Wood won her first Daytime Emmy in the Lead Actress category. Wood went on and won her second Daytime Emmy in the Lead Actress category in 2021.

Other roles 
In 2011, she starred in her first feature film, Final Destination 5. In September 2010, Wood's casting was announced and it was revealed that filming was underway in Vancouver, British Columbia, Canada. This film is the fifth in the Final Destination horror film franchise. Wood portrayed Olivia Castle. The character was described as "a smart mouthed beauty who wears glasses" and is "caught in a spine chilling, stomach churning situation that will make viewers squirm in their seats", which was a risky eye procedure which Wood was terrified to do. Final Destination 5 was a critical and commercial success, grossing over $157 million at the American Box Office, and becoming the highest-rated film from the franchise at the website Rotten Tomatoes, where it has been awarded a "Fresh" rating, consisting of 61% positive reviews from film critics. Her performance also received very positive reviews.

Wood had a guest role on The CW action-adventure series Arrow, which began airing in October 2012. She played Sara Lance (which she is later replaced by Caity Lotz). Arrow opened to positive reviews from critics and ratings of over 4.1 million. In 2013, Wood completed filming a Lifetime television film Her Husband's Betrayal, a suspense thriller in which she stars opposite Shawn Roberts. The film premiered on 2 August 2013. In July 2014, Wood filmed an appearance on the comedy series Anger Management, starring opposite Charlie Sheen. The episode aired on 1 September 2014.

Other ventures
Apart from her acting, Wood is an occasional disc jockey and singer. She released her debut single "After Hours", a dance-influenced song penned by her wardrobe stylist, Chaz E. Foley, in January 2012. Jamey Giddens of Zap2it described the "After Hours" music video as "naughty", and said "I am digging this thumping, raunchy track and the provocative video." In October 2012, Wood, who is described by Zap2it as a "vixen", covered Maxim magazine's 2013 Mini Calendar.

On 22 August 2013, it was announced that Wood would serve as host for an upcoming E! television series, Party On, which is an "eight-episode series" that is dedicated to "exposing the best party scenes the world has to offer". Vice president of programming and development for the network, Jeff Olde, stated: "We are excited to take viewers around the globe and behind the velvet ropes for fun in the sun at only the hottest, most elite vacation locales." Executive producer David Granger stated, "Jacqui is a brilliant host and we all see a wonderful opportunity to produce something very new and different given the high end glamour and sun soaked mischief that Europe has to offer." The series premiered on 5 December 2013.

Personal life
Wood is a supporter of pet rescue organizations, devoting time to spreading awareness via social activism including Twitter and Instagram about dog shelters and pet owners' responsibility, in addition to volunteering with charitable initiatives benefiting animal rescue.

In November 2017, Wood announced her engagement to Creative Artists Agency talent agent, Elan Ruspoli, and the pair eloped in July 2018. In March 2019, Wood gave birth to the couple's first child, a son (Rise). In February 2021, Wood gave birth to their second son (Lenix). In May 2022, Wood delivered their third son (Brando).   She and Ruspoli reside with their children in Los Angeles, California in Westlake Village.

Filmography

Film

Television

Music videos

Discography 
Source:

2012: "After Hours" 
2012: "Girl You Knew"

Awards and nominations

References

External links

1987 births
Living people
Actresses from Windsor, Ontario
Canadian people of Brazilian descent
Canadian people of French descent
Canadian people of Scottish descent
Canadian people of Cree descent
Canadian television actresses
Canadian film actresses
Canadian soap opera actresses
Actresses of Brazilian descent
Toronto Metropolitan University alumni
21st-century Canadian actresses
Daytime Emmy Award winners
Daytime Emmy Award for Outstanding Lead Actress in a Drama Series winners